Xystochroma clypeatum is a species of beetle in the family Cerambycidae. It was described by Schwarzer in 1923.

References

Callichromatini
Beetles described in 1923